The Curiosity of Chance is a 2006 comedy film directed by Russell P. Marleau, produced by Bigfoot Entertainment and starring Tad Hilgenbrink.

Plot
In 1980s Europe, flamboyant and gay 16-year-old Chance Marquis shows up at an international high school in a top hat and tails, immediately attracting the attention of the "queer-hating" resident bully, among others. Through his involvement in the school newspaper, he meets an introverted photographer with a mysterious briefcase, and while practicing tennis, he befriends a catty fashionista, both of whom act as his wingmen in his new high school. He also meets the jock-next-door, with whom he forms a tentative friendship, despite the jock's cacophonous group of friends. The film follows Chance through a year of high school, with its attendant drama, successes, and hijinks—including sneaking into a drag bar, where Chance begins to explore his true self.

Themes underscored throughout the film include facing one's fears as one grows into adulthood, and the barriers that people put up in order to cope with life. Chance claims to be strong with his nonchalant attitude, but when photos of him in drag show up all over school, Chance must face his own preachings of staying true to oneself.

Cast
 Tad Hilgenbrink as Chance Marquis
 Brett Chukerman as Levi Sparks
 Aldevina Da Silva as Twyla Tiller
 Pieter Van Nieuwenhuyze as Hank Hudson
 Chris Mulkey as Sir
 Maxim Maes as Brad Harden
 Colleen Cameron as Sienna Marquis
 Magali Uytterhaegen as Vice Principal Ophelia Smelker

Accolades
 Winner "Best Narrative Feature" at The Chicago LGBT International Film Festival - Chicago, IL 2007
 Winner "Best New Director" at Seattle Lesbian & Gay Film Festival - Seattle, WA 2006
 Honorable Mention "Best Music in a Feature Film" at Nashville Film Festival - Nashville, TN 2007
 Chosen as one of the Audience's and Critic's "Best of the Fest" at the Palm Springs International Film Festival - Palm Springs, CA 2007

See also
 List of lesbian, gay, bisexual, or transgender-related films by storyline
 Cross-dressing in film and television

References

External links
 
 
 
 
 Distributor's site

2006 comedy films
2006 LGBT-related films
2006 films
American comedy films
American LGBT-related films
American teen films
Belgian LGBT-related films
Cross-dressing in American films
English-language Belgian films
Films set in Europe
Films set in the 1980s
Films shot in Antwerp
American independent films
LGBT-related comedy films
Belgian independent films
Gay-related films
Drag (clothing)-related films
LGBT-related coming-of-age films
2000s English-language films
2000s American films